The 1993 Japan Open Tennis Championships was a combined men's and women's tennis tournament played on outdoor hard courts at the Ariake Coliseum in Tokyo in Japan that was part of the Championship Series of the 1993 ATP Tour and of Tier III of the 1993 WTA Tour. The tournament was held from 5 April through 11 April 1993. Pete Sampras and Kimiko Date won the singles titles.

Finals

Men's singles

 Pete Sampras defeated  Brad Gilbert 6–2, 6–2, 6–2
 It was Sampras' 3rd title of the year and the 16th of his career.

Women's singles

 Kimiko Date defeated  Stephanie Rottier 6–1, 6–3
 It was Date's 1st title of the year and the 2nd of her career.

Men's doubles

 Ken Flach /  Rick Leach defeated  Glenn Michibata /  David Pate 2–6, 6–3, 6–4

Women's doubles

 Ei Iida /  Maya Kidowaki defeated  Li Fang /  Kyoko Nagatsuka 6–2, 4–6, 6–4

References

External links
 Official website
  Association of Tennis Professionals (ATP) tournament profile

1993 Japan Open Tennis Championships